Dendroseius is a genus of mites in the family Digamasellidae. There are about eight described species in Dendroseius.

Species
These eight species belong to the genus Dendroseius:
 Dendroseius amoliensis Faraji, Sakenin-Chelav & Karg, 2006
 Dendroseius badenhorsti (Ryke, 1962)
 Dendroseius congoensis Wisniewski & Hirschmann, 1992
 Dendroseius gujarati Wisniewski & Hirschmann, 1989
 Dendroseius reductus Mašán, 2020
 Dendroseius reticulatus (Sheals, 1956)
 Dendroseius scotarius (Sheals, 1958)
 Dendroseius vulgaris Ma et al., 2014

References

Mesostigmata
Taxa named by Wolfgang Karg